Hellinsia procontias is a moth of the family Pterophoridae that is endemic to Assam, province of India.

The head is deep ochreous, but the lower edge of the face and anterior half of the crown are white. The antennae are whitish and the thorax is whitish, tinged or sprinkled with pale ochreous. The abdomen is whitish, longitudinally striped with ochreous. The forewings are white, irregularly suffused with pale ochreous. The hindwings are grey, although the third segment is whitish ochreous.

References

procontias
Moths described in 1908
Endemic fauna of India
Plume moths of Asia